This list includes Immovable Cultural Heritage sites in the Bor District of Serbia.

Liste

Archaeological Sites

Historic Landmarks

Spatial Cultural-Historical Units

See also 
 Immovable Cultural Heritage of Exceptional Importance (Serbia)
 Immovable Cultural Heritage of Great Importance (Serbia)

References

Cultural heritage of Serbia
Monuments and memorials in Serbia